Under Graph is a Japanese band that was formed in 1997.

Member profiles
Vocals/Guitar: Naoto Matohara (真戸原 直人, Matohara Naoto)
Birthdate:July 27, 1977
Equipment:
Gibson ES-325
Fender customshop '69stratocaster　Black
Shinos Luck6V amp
Guitar/background vocal : Ryosuke Asa (阿佐　亮介, Asa Ryōsuke)
Birthdate:February 6, 1978
Equipment:
Gibson Les Paul Standard
Fender tone master amp
Bass/background vocal : Kazuma Nakahara (中原　一真, Nakahara Kazuma)
Birthdate:August 5, 1977
Equipment:
Fender Precision Bass 1969 
Fender Precision Bass 1977
SVT-３PRO(HEAD) 
SVT-810E (Cabinet) Ampeg
Drums/background vocal/vocals : Naoko Taniguchi (谷口　奈穂子, Taniguchi Naoko)
Birthdate:December 6, 1981
Equipment:
Canopus

Past Member
Guitar/background vocal : Ryosuke Asa(阿佐　亮介, Asa Ryōsuke)

History
Under Graph started in 1997. They began to play live performances in Kobe; however, they moved their base to Tokyo in 2000. In March 2002, the band began to release their works. Word began to spread and Under Graph appeared as a regular program star on Nack5 radio. In 2004 they released their first major debut single. Since then, they have released additional singles and albums.

Discography

Albums
Zero e no Chowa
Subarashiki Nichijyou
Kokyuu Suru Jikan (2008)
Kono basho ni Umareta Bokutachi wa Itsumo Naniga Dekiru ka Wo Kangaeteiru (2009)
Under Graph (Single Best) (2010)
Katen gecchi (2011)
Ao no Toki (2011)

Singles
"Hana-bira" (2002)
"Ke Sera Sera" (2002)
"Tsubasa" (2004)
"Kimi no Koe" (2005)
"Paradym" (2005)
"Yubisaki Kara Sekai Wo" (2006)
"Majimesugi ru kimi he" (2006)
"Mata Kaerukara/Peace Antenna" (2007)
"Second Fantasy" (2007)
"Japanese Rock Fighter" (2008)
"Kokoro no Me" (2009)
"Natsukage" (2010)
"Sunzashi"
"Kaze Wo Yobe" (ending theme for TV anime Yowamushi Pedal) (2013)

DVD
"Yubisaki Kara Sekai Wo"
"Under Graph to Iu band no Eizou"
"spring tour'08 ～Kokyuu Suru Rakuen～"
"10th Documentary Films"

Digital single
"Too ki Hi"
"Haruka naru Miti"
"Kokoro no Me～Anniversary Medley～"
"Onnaji Kimoti"
"2111 ～Kako to Mirai de Warau Kodomotati He～"
"Yappari Tikyuu ha Aokatta"
"Kozo Kotoshi"
"Sora he Todoke"
"Daisanji Seityoki"

References
Jmusic Ignited

External links
Official Site

Japanese rock music groups